In Virgil's Aeneid, Camilla of the Volsci is the daughter of King Metabus and Casmilla.

Aeneid 
Driven from his throne, Metabus is chased into the wilderness by armed Volsci, his infant daughter in his hands.  The river Amasenus blocked his path, and, fearing for the child's welfare, Metabus bound her to a spear.  He promised Diana that Camilla would be her servant, a warrior virgin.  He then safely threw her to the other side, and swam across to retrieve her.  The baby Camilla was suckled by a mare, and once her  "first firm steps had [been] taken, the small palms were armed with a keen javelin; her sire a bow and quiver from her shoulder slung."  She was raised in her childhood to be a huntress and kept the companionship of her father and the shepherds in the hills and woods.

Modern scholars are unsure if Camilla was entirely an original invention of Virgil, or represents some actual Roman myth.  In his book Virgil's Aeneid: Semantic Relations and Proper Names, Michael Paschalis speculates that Virgil chose the river Amasenus (today the Amaseno, near Priverno, ancient Privernum) as a poetic allusion to the Amazons with whom Camilla is associated.

In the Aeneid, she helped her ally, King Turnus of the Rutuli, fight Aeneas and the Trojans in the war sparked by the courting of Princess Lavinia.  Arruns, a Trojan ally, stalked Camilla on the battlefield, and, when she was opportunely distracted by her pursuit of Chloreus, killed her. Diana's attendant, Opis, at her mistress' behest, avenged Camilla's death by slaying Arruns. Virgil says that Camilla was so fast on her feet that she could run over a field of wheat without breaking the tops of the plants, or over the ocean without wetting her feet.

Giovanni Boccaccio's De mulieribus claris includes a segment on Camilla.  She is not often a subject in art, but the female figure in Pallas and the Centaur by Sandro Botticelli (c. 1482, Uffizi) was called "Camilla" in the earliest record of the painting, an inventory of 1499, but then in an inventory of 1516 she is called Minerva, which remains her usual identification in recent times. She was the subject of an internationally successful opera, Camilla by Giovanni Bononcini (1696).

Camilla is similar to Penthesilea of Greek mythology.

See also 
107 Camilla

References

Notes

Lightbown, Ronald, Sandro Botticelli: Life and Work, 1989, Thames and Hudson
Virgil, Aeneid, Theodore C. Williams. trans. Boston. Houghton Mifflin Co. 1910. Online version

Further reading
 
 

Characters in the Aeneid
Women warriors